Kimwarer Airport is an airport in Kenya.

Location
Kimwarer Airport  is located in Elgeyo-Marakwet County in the village of Kimwarer, in the southwestern part of Kenya on the map.

The geographic coordinates of this airport are:0° 19' 12.00"N, 35° 39' 54.00"E 
(Latitude:0.32000; Longitude:35.665000).

Overview
Kimwarer  Airport is a small civilian airport, serving the village of Kimwarer and surrounding communities.

Airlines and destinations
There is no  regular, scheduled airline service to Nakuru Airport at this time.

See also
 Kenya Airports Authority
 Kenya Civil Aviation Authority
 List of airports in Kenya

References

External links
   Location of Kimwarer Airport At Google Maps
  Website of Kenya Airports Authority
 List of Airports In Kenya

Airports in Kenya
Airports in Rift Valley Province
Keiyo District